Events from the year 1977 in Kuwait.

Incumbents
Emir: Sabah Al-Salim Al-Sabah (until 31 December) Jaber Al-Ahmad Al-Jaber Al-Sabah (starting 31 December)
Prime Minister: Jaber Al-Ahmad Al-Sabah

Events

Births

 2 January - Khaled Al Shammari.
 3 April - Fawaz Al-Shammari.
 14 August - Youssef Al Thuwaney.

See also
Years in Jordan
Years in Syria

References

 
Kuwait
Kuwait
Years of the 20th century in Kuwait
1970s in Kuwait